George Amoako (born 31 July 1999) is a Ghanaian professional footballer who plays as midfielder for Al-Ahly Benghazi.

Career

Liberty Professionals 
Amoako started his career with Liberty Professionals. He made his debut on 25 March 2018 in a 3–1 loss to West African Football Academy (WAFA). During the 2019–20 season, he played 13 league matches and played a key role in the team before the league was cancelled due to the COVID-19 pandemic in Ghana. Amoako started 2020–21 season as the Liberty Professionals captain playing a key role and making 7 league appearances before being linked with teams in Tunisia. On 14 December 2020, he was adjudged the man of the match after helping Liberty to a 2–0 victory over Accra Great Olympics, which was the club's first victory of the season after a four match winless streak at the start of the season. In January 2021, he was linked with a move to Tunisian top-flight side US Tataoauine after agreeing to sign a three-year deal, however the deal fell through after both parties had a disagreement on the final terms. He returned to Liberty and ended the season with 21 league appearances.

Al-Ahly Benghazi 
On 20 September 2021, Amoako signed a two-year deal with Libyan club Al-Ahly Benghazi after being linked with a move to Ghanaian club Medeama.

References

External links 

 
 

Living people
1999 births
Ghanaian footballers
Association football midfielders
Liberty Professionals F.C. players
Ghana Premier League players
Al-Ahly SC (Benghazi) players
Libyan Premier League players
Ghanaian expatriate footballers
Ghanaian expatriate sportspeople in Libya
Expatriate footballers in Libya